The Hohnekamm or Hohne Kamm is a mountain ridge up to  high in the Harz mountains of central Germany. It is located in the state of Saxony-Anhalt, and is well known for its rock towers or tors, the Hohneklippen.

Location and surrounding area 
The wooded Hohnekamm lies within the Harz Nature Park in Saxony-Anhalt and within the Harz National Park. It lies around 2 km northeast of Schierke, a village on the Kalte Bode river and runs for about 3 kilometres in a northwest-to-southeast direction. The largest town in the area is  Wernigerode, 5 km to the northeast. To the east is Elbingerode. Drei Annen Hohne, 2 km southeast of the mountain, is the start of the Brocken Railway, a narrow gauge line, that runs along the southern slopes of the Hohneklippen westwards towards the Brocken. The Hohnekamm forms the watershed between the Holtemme to the north and the Wormke in the south. The region is part of the Harz National Park.

The tors 
The mountain is made of granite, which has formed bizarre tor-like rock formations at several places due to spheroidal weathering, especially the Hohneklippen on the upper slopes. The southeastern section of the Hohneklippen is calle the Hohnekopf (ca. ); from here the ski slopes of Drei Annen Hohne stretch
eastwards. Lower down, on its southern slopes, is the Trudenstein, another tor with good views.

Brocken Railway 
The Brocken Railway runs over the southern slopes of the Hohnekamm and past the neighbouring mountain of Erdbeerkopf. The line, 19.0 kilometres long and opened in 1898, is a narrow gauge railway that runs from the junction at Drei Annen Hohne northwest to the Brocken.

Sport 
In winter the area is used for cross-country skiing and tobogganing.

The Leistenklippe is checkpoint no. 15 in the Harzer Wandernadel hiking trail network.

Legend 
According to legend the rugged tors of the Hohneklippen were once three beautiful young women who were turned to stone here for their pride.

References

External links 
 Photographs of the tors

Mountains of the Harz
Mountains and hills of Saxony-Anhalt
Mountains under 1000 metres